Marashi (also Romanized as Mar‘ashī) is a village in Veys Rural District, Veys District, Bavi County, Khuzestan Province, Iran. At the 2006 census, its population was 79, in 12 families.

References 

Populated places in Bavi County